Poliçan, Perlikan, Polinian, Polanian, Pobolian, Polonian, Polian, Polyan, Polan may refer to:

Polian Slavs, ancient East Slavic tribes:
 Polans (eastern), living in the area of Dnieper river
 Polans (western), living in the area of Warta. The tribe unified most of the lands of present-day Poland under the Piast dynasty.
Bill Polian (born 1942), American football executive
Chris Polian (fl. 2013), son of Bill; American football executive
Brian Polian (born 1974), another son of Bill; American football coach
Pavel Polian (born 1952), Russian historian and geographer
Sophie Taillé-Polian (born 1974), French politician
 Polyán, the Hungarian name for Poiana Sibiului Commune, Sibiu County, Romania

See also
Pollan (disambiguation)
Polan (disambiguation)